Werner Bohne (1895-1940) was a German cinematographer of the Weimar and Nazi eras. He was killed in 1940, while working on a propaganda documentary during a battle as part of the invasion of Norway.

Selected filmography
 Ship in Distress (1925)
 Frisian Blood (1925)
 Our Emden (1926)
 Eternal Allegiance (1926)
 Light Cavalry (1927)
 A Love, A Thief, A Department Store (1928)
 The Stolen Face (1930)
 Susanne Cleans Up (1930)
 A Shot at Dawn (1932)
 A Mad Idea (1932)
 The Cheeky Devil (1932)
 You Will Be My Wife (1932)
 Spoiling the Game (1932)
 Inge and the Millions (1933)
 A Door Opens (1933)
 A Night in Venice (1934)
 Gold (1934)
 Amphitryon (1935)
 Ewiger Wald (1936)
The Unknown (1936)
 Maria the Maid (1936)
 Tomfoolery (1936)
 Land of Love (1937)
 Serenade (1937)
 The Model Husband (1937)
 Anna Favetti (1938)
 The Man Who Couldn't Say No (1938)
 The Deruga Case (1938)
 Her First Experience (1939)
 Three Fathers for Anna (1939)
 Hotel Sacher (1939)

References

Bibliography
 Youngkin, Stephen. The Lost One: A Life of Peter Lorre. University Press of Kentucky, 2005.

External links

1895 births
1940 deaths
German cinematographers
German documentary filmmakers
People from Lubin County
Kriegsmarine personnel killed in World War II